Hermione Isla Conyngham Corfield (born 19 December 1993) is an English actress. She has appeared in films, including Mission: Impossible – Rogue Nation (2015), Mr. Holmes (2015), Pride and Prejudice and Zombies (2016), XXX: Return of Xander Cage (2017), Star Wars: The Last Jedi (2017), Rust Creek (2018) and  The Misfits (2021).

Early life
Corfield was born in London, the daughter of Richard Conyngham Corfield, of the Corfield family of Chatwall Hall, Shropshire, and Jermyn Street shirt designer Emma Willis.

Career
Corfield made her film debut in 2014 with Colton's Big Night, a segment in the movie 50 Kisses, directed by Sebastian Solberg, where she plays a character named Anna. In 2015, she starred alongside Ian McKellen and Laura Linney in Mr. Holmes, and appeared in Mission: Impossible – Rogue Nation opposite Tom Cruise. She also worked with Penélope Cruz in an advertisement campaign for Schweppes. In 2014, she was cast in Fallen as Gabrielle Givens. In 2016, she appeared in Pride and Prejudice and Zombies as Cassandra. In 2017, she appeared in the film XXX: Return of Xander Cage alongside Vin Diesel, the Guy Ritchie-directed King Arthur: Legend of the Sword, and in Star Wars: The Last Jedi as Tallie Lintra, a Resistance A-Wing pilot and squadron leader. She also starred in the ITV drama The Halcyon as Emma Garland.

She starred in the 2017 film Bees Make Honey, and in the 2018 British comedy film Slaughterhouse Rulez, along with Asa Butterfield, Finn Cole, Michael Sheen, Nick Frost, and Simon Pegg.

Corfield received acclaim from critics for her performance in Rust Creek, which was released in cinemas on 4 January 2019. She played one of the central characters in the 2020 TV series We Hunt Together.

Filmography

Film

Television

Video games

Awards and nominations

References

External links
 
 
 
 

1993 births
21st-century British actresses
Actresses from London
British female models
English female models
British film actresses
British stage actresses
British television actresses
Living people
People educated at Downe House School
21st-century English women
21st-century English people